Car Wash: Original Motion Picture Soundtrack is a soundtrack double album released by the funk band Rose Royce on the MCA label in September 1976. It was produced by Norman Whitfield. It is the soundtrack/film score to the 1976 hit comedy Car Wash that featured Richard Pryor and George Carlin and is also the debut album for Rose Royce.

History
Although Rose Royce had already recorded most of a non-soundtrack album prior to Car Wash, their producer Norman Whitfield insisted that they record new material for the film's score. Initially, the film's producers approached Whitfield with a basic plot, and Whitfield set about creating the music for a film that, at that point, had not even been written yet.

The album was a major success, yielding three Billboard R&B Top Ten singles: "Car Wash", "I Wanna Get Next to You", and "I'm Going Down". The title track was also a number one single on the Billboard pop charts.  The album was digitally remastered and reissued on CD in 1996 by MCA Records.  The Car Wash soundtrack won a 1977 Grammy Award for Best Score Soundtrack Album.

Track listing

Personnel
Rose Royce
Kenji Brown – guitar
Lequeint "Duke" Jobe – bass
Victor Nix – keyboards
Henry Garner – drums
Kenny Copeland, Freddie Dunn – trumpet
Michael Moore – saxophone
Terry Santiel – congas
Gwen "Rose" Dickey – vocals

Additional Musicians/Personnel
Mark Davis, Ben Wilber – keyboards
Melvin "Wah-Wah Watson" Ragin – guitar
Brian Haner – guitar
Richard Pryor – dialogue on "Richard Pryor Dialogue"
The Pointer Sisters – vocals on "You Gotta Believe"

Production
Norman Whitfield – producer, recording engineer
Baker Bigsby, Cal Harris, Leanard Jackson – recording engineer
Clay McMurray – recording engineer, album coordinator
Paul Riser – orchestra direction

Charts

Singles

References

External links
 

Albums produced by Norman Whitfield
Albums arranged by Paul Riser
1976 soundtrack albums
MCA Records soundtracks
Rose Royce albums
Rhythm and blues soundtracks
Soul soundtracks
Disco soundtracks
1976 debut albums
Comedy film soundtracks